Kolathanvalsu is a small village in Pethampalayam panchayat in Perundurai taluk in Erode district, Tamil Nadu, India.

Etymology
There was a big pond at the east side of the village, so the village name became Kolathanvalasu.

Geography
This village is located at 11.364844, 77.572323. The whole village is full of agricultural land. There is a big pond at the northern-east side of the village.

People 
The population is around 500 people. Most of the families are Kongu Vellalar, and there is a very small percentage of Chettiar.

Economy
The main source of economy is agriculture and highways contract businesses. Many people are employed too; some are also employers. Some of them also conduct financial business.

Education
At the centre of the village is the Union Primary School. The village is surrounded by a number of government and private schools and colleges.

Temples
There are five major temples in the village:

 Shree Maari Amman temple
 Shree Shivarajakkal Temple
 Shree Seedevi Boodevi sametha Vaasudevaperumal Temple
 Shree Pattatharasi Amman temple
 Shree Kottappudi Muniyappan Swamy temple

Villages in Erode district